Salt in the Wound is a 1969 Italian "macaroni combat" war film directed by Tonino Ricci and starring Klaus Kinski and George Hilton.

Plot
Two condemned soldiers (Klaus Kinski and Ray Saunders) and their overseeing West Point officer (George Hilton) survive a German ambush on their way to execution. They make their way to a desolate Italian village which happens to be in the path of a German advance. While there they learn the meaning of self-sacrifice and courage when they become emotionally involved in the people and fortunes of the town and must defend the village from the invading German force.

Cast
 George Hilton as Michael Sheppard
 Klaus Kinski as Cpl. Brian Haskins / Norman Carr
 Ray Saunders as Pvt. John Grayson / Calvin Mallory
 Betsy Bell as Daniela
 Ugo Adinolfi as American soldier
 Piero Mazzinghi as Priest
 Enrico Pagano as Mascetti
 Roberto Pagano as The Little Michele
 Giorgio De Giorgi as Captain
 Angelo Susani as Sergeant

Releases
Wild East Productions released the film on a limited edition NTSC Region 0 DVD double feature with Churchill's Leopards in 2007.

References

External links

1969 films
1960s Italian-language films
Italian Campaign of World War II films
Macaroni Combat films
Films directed by Tonino Ricci
1960s Italian films